Wartburg Theological Seminary is a seminary of the Evangelical Lutheran Church in America  in Dubuque, Iowa. It offers three graduate-level degrees (MA, MA Diaconal Ministry, and M.Div.), a Theological Education for Emerging Ministries certificate, and a diploma in Anglican Studies, all of which are accredited by the Association of Theological Schools in the United States and Canada and the Higher Learning Commission. Students can also choose to add two concentrations: Youth, Culture, and Mission; and Hispanic Ministry.
 
All three of Wartburg Theological Seminary's master's degrees offer the option for Distributed Learning Programs, which combine online learning, intensive courses on-campus, and residential formation. Wartburg also offers a Fully Distributed Master of Arts option without a semester-long residency requirement.

Three academic and missional centers are found at Wartburg Theological Seminary, built on their historic strengths: the Center for Global Theologies, the Center for Theology & Land (rural ministry), and the Center for Youth Ministries.

The Lutheran Seminary Program in the Southwest is a program of Wartburg Theological Seminary and the Lutheran School of Theology at Chicago. The program educates women and men for ordained ministry through the Theological Education for Emerging Ministry.

Wartburg Theological Seminary also has long-term ties with global partners, including: Haiti, Tanzania, Guyana, Namibia, Papua New Guinea (with the PNG Museum located on campus), and others.

Theological orientation
Theological education at Wartburg Theological Seminary is shaped by faithful study and interpretation of the Scripture as God's Word and is informed by Christian tradition and the Lutheran Confessions. Courses are reviewed by students and faculty to ensure they instill the twelve core pastoral diaconal practices outlined on the website. Wartburg is a Reconciling in Christ seminary.

See also
Wartburg Castle - the inspiration for Wartburg Seminary's architecture
Johann Konrad Wilhelm Löhe - founder of Wartburg Seminary
Richard A. Jensen - professor at Wartburg Seminary

References

External links
Official website

Seminaries and theological colleges in Iowa
Education in Dubuque, Iowa
Educational institutions established in 1854
Religion in Dubuque, Iowa
Lutheran seminaries
Lutheran buildings and structures in North America
1854 establishments in Iowa